Romani people in North Macedonia are one of the constitutional peoples of the country.

According to the last census from 2021, there were 46,433 people counted as Romani, or 2.53% of the population. The majority are Muslim Romani people. Another 3,843 people have been counted as "Egyptians" (0.2%). 

One of the majority group are the Arlije, and Gurbeti.

Other sources claim the number to be between 80,000 and 260 000 Roma in North Macedonia or approximately 4 to 12% of the total population.

The municipality of Šuto Orizari is the only municipality in the world with a Muslim Romani people majority and the only municipality where Balkan Romani is an official language alongside Macedonian. The mayor of the municipality, Kurto Dudush, is an ethnic Roma.

In 2009, the Government of the Republic of North Macedonia took measures to enlarge inclusion of Romani in the education process.

North Macedonia is the region's leader in respecting the rights of the Romani people. It is the first country in the region with a minister of Romani ethnicity and also has many Romani in high government positions. However, there is still a lot to be done concerning the education and integration of the Romani.

History

Origin
The Romani people originate from Northern India, presumably from the northwestern Indian states Rajasthan and Punjab.

The linguistic evidence has indisputably shown that roots of Romani language lie in India: the language has grammatical characteristics of Indian languages and shares with them a big part of the basic lexicon, for example, body parts or daily routines.

More exactly, Romani shares the basic lexicon with Hindi and Punjabi. It shares many phonetic features with Marwari, while its grammar is closest to Bengali.

Genetic findings in 2012 suggest the Romani originated in northwestern India and migrated as a group.
According to a genetic study in 2012, the ancestors of present scheduled tribes and scheduled caste populations of northern India, traditionally referred to collectively as the Ḍoma, are the likely ancestral populations of the modern European Roma.

In February 2016, during the International Roma Conference, the Indian Minister of External Affairs stated that the people of the Roma community were children of India. The conference ended with a recommendation to the Government of India to recognize the Roma community spread across 30 countries as a part of the Indian diaspora.

Language 
The Romani in North Macedonia speak three different Balkan Romani dialects: Arli (the most prominent of the three), Džambaz, and Burgudži. While 46,433 individuals declared Romani ethnicity in the 2021 census, only 31,721 declared Romani as their mother tongue.

Gallery

Religion
The majority are Muslim Romani people who are Cultural Muslims and some practised Sufism, with a minority of Christian who belong to the Eastern Orthodox Church and a few to Evangelicalism.

Notable people
Emil Abaz
Rahim Burhan
Ferus Mustafov
Esma Redžepova
Muharem Serbezovski

References

External links
 "Romani language in Macedonia in the Third Millennium: Progress and Problems", Victor Friedman.
 "The Romani Language in the Republic of Macedonia: Status, Usage and Sociolinguistic Perspectives, Victor Friedman.

Romani in North Macedonia